Vishka Asayesh (born November 7, 1972) is an Iranian actress, set designer, and art director. She obtained a degree in set design from the UK. She is also a sculptor and has exhibited her art works at Etemad Gallery in Tehran in 2012.

Career
Vishka became a household name after appearing in the historical TV series Imam Ali in 1992. She has appeared in Love + 2 (1998), The Visitor of Rey (2000), Ice Flower (2004), No Men Allowed (2011), Snow on the Pines (2011), Thirteen (2013), I am Diego Maradona (2014), and Sperm Whale (2015).

Her appearance in No Men Allowed (2011) won a Crystal Simorgh for Best Actress in a Leading Role at the Fajr International Film Festival in 2011. She was nominated and won the best actress award several times at the international film festivals for acting in The Badger movie, directed by Kazem Mollaie in 2021.

Awards
 Best Actress for No Men Allowed (2011), (dir. Rambod Javan) at the Fajr International Film Festival in 2011.
 Best Actress and Best Ensemble Cast for The Badger, (dir. Kazem Mollaie) at the “19th. Riverside International Film Festival” (USA) / April 2021 
 Nominated for the Best Female Actor for The Badger, (dir. Kazem Mollaie) at the “11th. Queens World Film Festival” (USA) / July 2021 
 Special Jury Award for Acting for The Badger, (dir. Kazem Mollaie) at the “37th. Los Angeles Asian Pacific Film Festival”, Academy Awards® Qualifying (USA) / Sept. 2021 (The jury shared: “Asayesh commands your attention as the fiercely independent Soodah, an entrepreneur and mother starting her second marriage when tragedy strikes. She is a modern woman in modern Iran, who must face the humiliation of seeking help from various authority figures while maintaining her dignity. She gives a stunning performance that invites you into the complexity of her world.”) 
 Best Actress for The Badger, (dir. Kazem Mollaie) at the “10th. Winter Film Awards International Film Festival” (USA) / Oct. 2021 
 Best Actress for The Badger, (dir. Kazem Mollaie) at the “6th. Calella Film Festival” [Low Budget Section] (SPAIN) / Oct. 2021

Work

Theater
Mississippi Dies Seated (Homayoun Ghanizadeh, 2016)

Films
The Night Guardian (Reza Mirkarimi, 2022)
The Badger (Kazem Mollaie, 2020)  
We Are All Together (2018)
Nahang Anbar (Saman Moghaddam, 2015)
Dar Moddat Maloum (Vahid Amirkhani, 2015) 
Man va Sharmin (Bijan Shirmarz, 2015) 
Sokoot (George Haasehmzadeh, 2015) 
Sizdah (Houman Seyedi, 2014)
Nikaan va Bacheh Ghoul (Rahman Rezayi, 2012)
Barf rooye kajha (Payman Maadi, 2011)
Khabam Miad (Reza Attaran, 2011)
Porteghal Khoni (Cyrus Alvand, 2010) 
No Men Allowed (Rambod Javan, 2010)
The book of law (Maziar Miri, 2009)
Shirin (2008)
Gol-e Yakh (Kiumars Pourahmad, 2004)
Hasht Paa (Alireza Davood Nejad, 2004) 
Mosafere Rey (Davood Mir Bagheri, 2000) 
Bolough (Masoud Jafari Jowzani, 1999)
Eshgh +2 (Reza Mir-Karimi, 1998)
Saahere (Davood Mir Bagheri, 1997)

Set designer
Zanan Venusi, Mardan Merikhi (2010)
Masoumiat Az Dast Rafteh (2002)

TV series
Blue Whale (Fereydoun Jeyrani, 2019)
Pardeh Neshin (Behrooz Shoeibi, 2015)
Mokhtarnameh (Davood Mirbagheri, 2010)Nardebam-e Aseman (Mohammad Hossein Lotfi, 2009)Imam Ali (Shaheed-e-Kufa)'' (Davood Mirbagheri, 1991)

References

External links 
 

1972 births
Living people
People from Tehran
Iranian art directors
Actresses from Tehran
Iranian film actresses
Iranian stage actresses
Women graphic designers
Iranian costume designers
Iranian television actresses
20th-century Iranian actresses
21st-century Iranian actresses
Crystal Simorgh for Best Actress winners